Martin Damm and Radek Štěpánek were the defending champions and successfully defended their title, winning in the final 6–2, 6–7(4–7), [10–3], against Mark Knowles and Daniel Nestor.

Seeds

Draw

Draw

External links
Main Draw

Open 13
2006 ATP Tour